Originally founded in 1988 by Mark Miller in Vancouver, Washington, First Aid Only aimed to produce a better first aid kit for the average consumer than the options available at the time.

History

1988 - 1997 

First Aid Only was founded in 1988. The company created all-purpose first aid kits for small businesses and consumers across the United States. The company’s initial first aid kit, FAO-134, is still being sold.

In years thereafter, the company continued to expand the number of offerings. By 1992, First Aid Only was generating $3.4 million in sales and moved to a modern 50,000 square-feet facility in Vancouver, Washington.

1998 – 2014 

After 10 years, the company started focusing on Occupational Safety & Health Administration (OSHA) compliance products for the workspace. As part of this business expansion, the company thoughtfully decided to continue to do all of its assembly and distribution work in the United States.

In its search for product innovation and improvement of delivery mechanisms for first aid products, First Aid Only acquired First Aid Exchange in 2006. First Aid Exchange owned the rights to SmartCompliance, a first aid solution that makes it convenient for organizations to remain compliant with OSHA as well as ANSI standards.

In June 2014, Acme United Corporation acquired First Aid Only for $13.8 million. First Aid Only had revenues in 2013 of $17.3 million. Shortly after the acquisition, Acme United started making capital investments in First Aid Only’s Vancouver facility, both through mechanization and staffing increases.

First Aid Only as an Acme United Brand 

Acme United has been in the first aid business for over 40 years and was a competitor of First Aid Only with its PhysiciansCare and Pac-Kit brands. Combined, the three brands are among the top-10 producers of first aid kits in the United States, and they accounted for 35% of Acme United’s total sales in 2014.

In 2015, Acme United consolidated its production facilities. As such, the Pac-Kit production was moved from Norwalk, Connecticut to the First Aid Only plant in Washington state. This resulted in production efficiencies and cost savings.

Today, First Aid Only is known for its SmartCompliance kits. Most businesses are federally mandated to have first aid solutions that are compliant with OSHA as well as ANSI standards. These SmartCompliance first aid supply cabinets ensure that a business is covered.

References

External links
First Aid Only Company Website
Occupational Safety and Health Administration (OSHA) Website
American National Standards Institute (ANSI) Website
Acme United Corp. Company Website
Pac-Kit Company Website
PhysiciansCare Company Website

Companies established in 1988
Companies based in Vancouver, Washington
First aid
Medical technology companies of the United States
Occupational safety and health